The Main road 14 is a south–north direction Secondary class main road in the Kisalföld, that connects the Main road 1 change to the border of Slovakia.

The road, as well as all other main roads in Hungary, is managed and maintained by Magyar Közút, state owned company.

See also

 Roads in Hungary

Sources

External links

 Hungarian Public Road Non-Profit Ltd. (Magyar Közút Nonprofit Zrt.)
 National Infrastructure Developer Ltd.

Main roads in Hungary
Győr-Moson-Sopron County